Ticrapo District is one of the 13 districts of Castrovirreyna province in Peru. Ticrapo is the birth place of Lina Medina, the youngest confirmed mother in history.

References